Biological imaging may refer to any imaging technique used in biology.
Typical examples include:
 Bioluminescence imaging, a technique for studying laboratory animals using luminescent protein
 Calcium imaging, determining the calcium status of a tissue using fluorescent light
 Diffuse optical imaging, using near-infrared light to generate images of the body
 Diffusion-weighted imaging, a type of MRI that uses water diffusion
 Fluorescence lifetime imaging, using the decay rate of a fluorescent sample
 Gallium imaging, a nuclear medicine method for the detection of infections and cancers
 Imaging agent, a chemical designed to allow clinicians to determine whether a mass is benign or malignant 
 Imaging studies, which includes many medical imaging techniques
 Magnetic resonance imaging (MRI), a non-invasive method to render images of living tissues
 Magneto-acousto-electrical tomography (MAET), is an imaging modality to image the electrical conductivity of biological tissues
 Medical imaging, creating images of the human body or parts of it, to diagnose or examine disease
 Microscopy, creating images of objects or features too small to be detectable by the naked human eye
 Molecular imaging, used to study molecular pathways inside organisms
 Non-contact thermography, is the field of thermography that derives diagnostic indications from infrared images of the human body.
 Nuclear medicine, uses administered radioactive substances to create images of internal organs and their function.
 Optical imaging, using light as an investigational tool for biological research and medical diagnosis
 Optoacoustic imaging, using the photothermal effect, for the accuracy of spectroscopy with the depth resolution of ultrasound
 Photoacoustic Imaging, a technique to detect vascular disease and cancer using non-ionizing laser pulses  
 Ultrasound imaging, using very high frequency sound to visualize muscles and internal organs

References

Biological techniques and tools
Imaging